Stolyarchuk is a Russian and Ukrainian language surname derived from the occupation of stolyar (carpenter, cabinetmaker, joiner) and literally meaning "son of carpenter". Notable people with this surname include:

Boris Vasilievich Stolyarchuk, a Chernobyl liquidator, one of the last surviving members of the Reactor No. 4 shift that were on duty at the moment of the catastrophe
 (1906-1944),  World War II Soviet military commander, Hero of the Soviet Union
Yuriy Vasylyovych Stolyarchuk (born 1962), Ukrainian lawyer and statesman

Russian-language surnames
Ukrainian-language surnames
Occupational surnames
Patronymic surnames